Barand-e Olya (also Romanized as Bārand-e ‘Olyā; also known as Bārand-e Bālā) is a village in Padena-ye Olya Rural District, Padena District, Semirom County, Isfahan Province, Iran. At the 2006 census, its population was 302, in 70 families.

References 

Populated places in Semirom County